Count Henry Greffulhe (25 December 1848 – 31 March 1932) was a French heir, socialite and politician. He was the son of Louis-Charles Greffuhle and his wife, Félicité-Pauline-Marie de la Rochefoucauld d'Estissac.

He was a personal friend of author Marcel Proust. He has been pointed out as one of the main inspirations for the character of the duc de Guermantes in Proust’s novel, À la recherche du temps perdu.

References

External links
 

1848 births
1932 deaths